Harran is a former municipality in the old Nord-Trøndelag county, Norway. The municipality existed from 1923 until its dissolution in 1964.  The municipality was located in the Namdalen valley and it included all of what is now the northern part of the municipality of Grong in Trøndelag county.  The administrative centre was the village of Harran where the Harran Church is located.

History
The municipality of Harran was established on 1 July 1923 when the large municipality of Grong was divided into four smaller municipalities: Grong (population: 1,272), Harran (population: 630), Røyrvik (population: 392), and Namsskogan (population: 469).  During the 1960s, there were many municipal mergers across Norway due to the work of the Schei Committee.  On 1 January 1964, the neighboring municipalities of Harran (population: 1,085) and Grong (population: 1,962) were merged (back together) to form a new municipality called Grong.

Name
The origin of the municipal name is uncertain. The area has been known as Harran for quite some time, but the original pronunciation was more like Harrei, so it is possible that the original name was something similar to that.

Government
During its existence, this municipality was governed by a municipal council of elected representatives, which in turn elected a mayor.

Municipal council
The municipal council  of Harran was made up of 17 representatives that were elected to four year terms.  The party breakdown of the final municipal council was as follows:

Mayors
The mayors of Harran:

 1923–1928: Johannes Mørkved (Bp)
 1929–1934: Johannes J. Fiskum (V)
 1935–1941: Severin Melby (Ap)
 1941–1945: Tore Rigstad Kristiansen (NS)
 1945–1951: Severin Melby (Ap)
 1952–1958: Ivar Iversen (V)
 1959-1959: Torleif Hermanstad (Bp)
 1960–1963: Knut Romstad (Ap)

See also
List of former municipalities of Norway

References

Grong
Former municipalities of Norway
1923 establishments in Norway
1964 disestablishments in Norway